Baarlo is a hamlet in the Dutch province of Overijssel. It is located in the municipality Steenwijkerland, about 1 km northwest of the city of Blokzijl.

It was first mentioned in 1219 as Barlo, and means "barren forest". During the Middle Ages, it used to have a chapel, however it was damaged in a 1825 flood, and demolished in 1836. Until the Noordoostpolder was reclaimed, the village lay on the dyke of the IJsselmeer. In 1840, it was home to 145 people.

Baarlo should not be confused with the village with the same name in the municipality of Zwartewaterland, about 15 km to the southeast.

References

Populated places in Overijssel
Steenwijkerland